George Evans (born January 31, 1971) is a retired American professional basketball player. He played in college for George Mason University from 1997 to 2001 where he ranks first all-time at George Mason in steals (218), second in blocked shots (211), third in points (1,953) and rebounds (953), and 13th in assists (226).

Basketball career

College
Evans shares a record with David Robinson as being the only two players in Colonial Athletic Association history to win three CAA Player of the Year awards. He is also just one of four players in NCAA history to record more than 200 steals, assists and blocked shots for a career, joining Danny Manning, Lionel Simmons and Shane Battier.

Professional
After he graduated from George Mason University in 2001, Evans was the first pick overall in the USBL draft on April 12, 2001, by the now defunct Maryland Mustangs. Soon after, he joined the professional basketball team Mons-Hainaut of the Basketball League Belgium. He was named the Belgian League's MVP in 2006. With the 2008/09 Season he joined TBB Trier in Germany's First Division. He left the team in April 2011 for family reasons.

Personal
Evans served in the Army Reserves and is a veteran of the Persian Gulf War.

Statistics

Professional career
Mons-Hainaut – Belgian League 1

References

1971 births
Living people
American expatriate basketball people in Belgium
American expatriate basketball people in Germany
American men's basketball players
Basketball players from Virginia
Belfius Mons-Hainaut players
Centers (basketball)
George Mason Patriots men's basketball players
Power forwards (basketball)
Sportspeople from Portsmouth, Virginia
United States Army reservists
United States Army soldiers
United States Army personnel of the Gulf War
United States Basketball League players